Charles Coe (born October 31, 1948) is an American football coach and former football and baseball player. He currently serves as the assistant head coach at Missouri Baptist University in Creve Coeur, Missouri.

From 2003 to 2006, Coe served as the head football coach at Alabama State University, compiling a record of 29–18. A standout two-sport athlete at Kansas State University during his playing days, Coe spent two years in the Detroit Tigers minor league system.

Coe is the father of former National Football League (NFL) cornerback Michael Coe.

Head coaching record

References

External links
 Missouri Baptist profile
 Texas Southern profile
 

1948 births
Living people
Baseball second basemen
Baseball shortstops
Alabama State Hornets football coaches
Ball State Cardinals football coaches
Batavia Trojans players
Cincinnati Bearcats football coaches
Iowa Hawkeyes football coaches
Kansas State Wildcats baseball players
Kansas State Wildcats football coaches
Kansas State Wildcats football players
Louisville Cardinals football coaches
Memphis Tigers football coaches
Missouri Baptist Spartans football coaches
Missouri Tigers football coaches
Oakland Raiders coaches
Pittsburgh Panthers football coaches
Tennessee Volunteers football coaches
Texas Southern Tigers football coaches
Players of American football from St. Louis
Baseball players from St. Louis
African-American coaches of American football
African-American players of American football
African-American baseball players
21st-century African-American sportspeople
20th-century African-American sportspeople